Bernd Effing (born 26 April 1948) is a German gymnast. He competed in eight events at the 1972 Summer Olympics.

References

1948 births
Living people
German male artistic gymnasts
Olympic gymnasts of West Germany
Gymnasts at the 1972 Summer Olympics
Sportspeople from Schleswig-Holstein